The 2005 CFL season is considered to be the 52nd season in modern-day Canadian football, although it is officially the 48th Canadian Football League season.

CFL News in 2005
New ownership groups took control of two CFL franchises in the 2005 season.  The Calgary Stampeders were sold to an ownership group that is led by Ted Hellard and former Stampeder legend, John Forzani.  After going through ownership in-fighting, the Ottawa Renegades announced that a new ownership group led by Bill Smith and former Ottawa Rough Riders owner, Bernie Glieberman, would take over the team.

In April, the Toronto Argonauts plans to build a new stadium at York University had been cancelled due to rising costs.  However, the owners of the Rogers Centre announced that the Argonauts would be able to remain at the stadium rent-free.  Previously, the Argonauts were charged the highest in terms of rent than any other team in the CFL.

Before the season began, the CFL through its partnership with Reebok, introduced new home and away uniforms for all nine teams.  Third alternate uniforms were created for all of the teams with the exception of the Toronto Argonauts and the Hamilton Tiger-Cats.

On June 11, the first ever CFL game in Halifax, Nova Scotia is played for the special Touchdown Atlantic pre-season game between the Toronto Argonauts and the Hamilton Tiger-Cats, which ended in a 16–16 draw at Huskies Stadium.

More than 2,303,455 fans filled the stadiums across the country to catch CFL games in 2005, which was a 4% increase from the 2004 season.  The 2005 regular season attendance figure also became the all-time highest grossing regular season attendance record in CFL history, by breaking the previous record of 2,229,834 that was set in the 16-game 1978 season. In addition, it marked the fourth consecutive year of national attendance increases for the league.

The 2005 season also saw television audience increases on TSN, CBC and RDS. TSN's CFL broadcast drew an average of 395,000 viewers for its 55 regular season games (and one preseason game), the highest average CFL audience in TSN history.  The figure eclipsed the 2004 average minute audience by 27%, with ratings in the male 18–34 demographic specifically, increasing 30% over last season.  CFL on CBC recorded a 6% increase in 2005 with an average audience of 462,000 (versus 437,000 in 2004), despite a 50-day Canadian Media Guild strike that left the CBC without access to any announcers between August 20 and October 4. Average audiences in RDS were also on the rise in 2005. With an 18-game schedule, RDS averaged 201,000 viewers (versus 189,000 in 2004), a 6% increase over last season.

On October 28, Saskatchewan linebacker, Trevis Smith was charged with aggravated sexual assault in Surrey, BC for allegedly having unprotected sex while knowing that he is HIV positive.  Then on November 18, Trevis Smith was charged with the same offence in Regina, Saskatchewan after another woman came forward alleging that Smith did not tell her that he was HIV positive before they had unprotected sex. A court date has been set for 2006.

On November 27, the Grey Cup game was decided in overtime for only the second time in its 93-year history, as the Edmonton Eskimos defeated the Montreal Alouettes, 38–35 in double OT, at BC Place Stadium in Vancouver, B.C.

Records and Milestones
Winnipeg slotback, Milt Stegall surpassed Allen Pitts' mark for most career receiving TDs with 126.

Eskimos quarterback, Ricky Ray completed 479 passes, which marked the highest single season total for a quarterback.

Winnipeg Blue Bombers punter, Jon Ryan broke Lui Passaglia's single season average punt record of 50.2 yards by averaging 50.6 yards per punt.

After setting the CFL historical precedent of four receivers on one team reaching the 1000-yard mark in one season the previous year, the Montreal Alouettes again accomplished the feat in 2005, this time with Kerry Watkins (1364 yards), Terry Vaughn (1113 yards), Ben Cahoon (1067 yards), and Dave Stala (1037 yards).

The BC Lions started the season by winning 11 consecutive games and were two wins away of breaking the 12–0 record set by the 1948 Calgary Stampeders. The Lions could have broken the record, but eventually lost four straight games and ended their last seven games by going 1–6.

Regular season
Note: GP = Games Played, W = Wins, L = Losses, T = Ties, PF = Points For, PA = Points Against, Pts = Points

Teams in bold finished in playoff positions.

Notes
Due to the cross-over rule, the Saskatchewan Roughriders play the Montreal Alouettes in the Scotiabank Eastern Semi-Final.

Grey Cup playoffs

The Edmonton Eskimos are the 2005 Grey Cup Champions, defeating the Montreal Alouettes 38–35 in an overtime thriller played in Vancouver's BC Place Stadium.  It was the first Grey Cup game in 44 years to go to overtime.
The Eskimos' Ricky Ray (QB) was named the Grey Cup's Most Valuable Player and the Eskimos' Mike Maurer (FB) was the Grey Cup's Most Valuable Canadian.

Playoff bracket

*-Team won in Overtime.

CFL Leaders
 CFL Passing Leaders
 CFL Rushing Leaders
 CFL Receiving Leaders

2005 CFL All-Stars

Offense
QB – Damon Allen, Toronto Argonauts
RB – Charles Roberts, Winnipeg Blue Bombers
RB – Joffrey Reynolds, Calgary Stampeders
SB – Jason Tucker, Edmonton Eskimos
SB – Milt Stegall, Winnipeg Blue Bombers
WR – Kerry Watkins, Montreal Alouettes
WR – Jason Armstead, Ottawa Renegades
C – Bryan Chiu, Montreal Alouettes
OG – Scott Flory, Montreal Alouettes
OG – Andrew Greene, Saskatchewan Roughriders
OT – Uzooma Okeke, Montreal Alouettes
OT – Gene Makowsky, Saskatchewan Roughriders

Defense
DT – Scott Schultz, Saskatchewan Roughriders
DT – Adriano Belli, Hamilton Tiger-Cats
DE – Brent Johnson, BC Lions
DE – Jonathan Brown, Toronto Argonauts
LB – John Grace, Calgary Stampeders
LB – Michael Fletcher, Toronto Argonauts
LB – Kevin Eiben, Toronto Argonauts
CB – Omarr Morgan, Saskatchewan Roughriders
CB – Jordan Younger, Toronto Argonauts
DB – Korey Banks, Ottawa Renegades
DB – Eddie Davis, Saskatchewan Roughriders
DS – Richard Karikari, Montreal Alouettes

Special teams
P – Jon Ryan, Winnipeg Blue Bombers
K – Sandro DeAngelis, Calgary Stampeders
ST – Corey Holmes, Saskatchewan Roughriders

2005 Western All-Stars

Offence
QB – Henry Burris, Calgary Stampeders
RB – Charles Roberts, Winnipeg Blue Bombers
RB – Joffrey Reynolds, Calgary Stampeders
SB – Jason Tucker, Edmonton Eskimos
SB – Milt Stegall, Winnipeg Blue Bombers
WR – Elijah Thurmon, Saskatchewan Roughriders
WR – Ryan Thelwell, BC Lions
C – Jeremy O'Day, Saskatchewan Roughriders
OG – Jay McNeil, Calgary Stampeders
OG – Andrew Greene, Saskatchewan Roughriders
OT – Jeff Pilon, Calgary Stampeders
OT – Gene Makowsky, Saskatchewan Roughriders

Defence
DT – Scott Schultz, Saskatchewan Roughriders
DT – Sheldon Napastuk, Calgary Stampeders
DE – Brent Johnson, BC Lions
DE – Gavin Walls, Winnipeg Blue Bombers
LB – John Grace, Calgary Stampeders
LB – George White, Calgary Stampeders
LB – Otis Floyd, BC Lions
CB – Omarr Morgan, Saskatchewan Roughriders
CB – Malcolm Frank, Edmonton Eskimos
DB – Donny Brady, Edmonton Eskimos
DB – Eddie Davis, Saskatchewan Roughriders
DS – Barron Miles, BC Lions

Special teams
P – Jon Ryan, Winnipeg Blue Bombers
K – Sandro DeAngelis, Calgary Stampeders
ST – Corey Holmes, Saskatchewan Roughriders

2005 Eastern All-Stars

Offence
QB – Damon Allen, Toronto Argonauts
RB – Josh Ranek, Ottawa Renegades
RB – Robert Edwards, Montreal Alouettes
SB – Arland Bruce III, Toronto Argonauts
SB – Ben Cahoon, Montreal Alouettes
WR – Kerry Watkins, Montreal Alouettes
WR – Jason Armstead, Ottawa Renegades
C – Bryan Chiu, Montreal Alouettes
OG – Scott Flory, Montreal Alouettes
OG – Jude St. John, Toronto Argonauts
OT – Uzooma Okeke, Montreal Alouettes
OT – Bernard Williams, Toronto Argonauts

Defence
DT – Ed Philion, Montreal Alouettes
DT – Adriano Belli, Hamilton Tiger-Cats
DE – Anthony Collier, Ottawa Renegades
DE – Jonathan Brown, Toronto Argonauts
LB – Duane Butler, Montreal Alouettes
LB – Michael Fletcher, Toronto Argonauts
LB – Kevin Eiben, Toronto Argonauts
CB – Adrion Smith, Toronto Argonauts
CB – Jordan Younger, Toronto Argonauts
DB – Korey Banks, Ottawa Renegades
DB – Kenny Wheaton, Toronto Argonauts
DS – Richard Karikari, Montreal Alouettes

Special teams
P – Noel Prefontaine, Toronto Argonauts
K – Noel Prefontaine, Toronto Argonauts
ST – Jason Armstead, Ottawa Renegades

2005 CFLPA All-Stars

Offence
QB – Damon Allen, Toronto Argonauts
OT – Uzooma Okeke,	Montreal Alouettes
OT – Gene Makowsky, Saskatchewan Roughriders
OG – Dan Comiskey,	Edmonton Eskimos
OG – Scott Flory, Montreal Alouettes
C – Bryan Chiu, Montreal Alouettes
RB – Charles Roberts, Winnipeg Blue Bombers
FB – Chris Szarka, Saskatchewan Roughriders
SB – Milt Stegall, Winnipeg Blue Bombers
SB – Jason Tucker,	Edmonton Eskimos
WR – Arland Bruce III, Toronto Argonauts
WR – Kerry Watkins, Montreal Alouettes

Defence
DE – Joe Montford,	Edmonton Eskimos
DE – Brent Johnson, BC Lions
DT – Adriano Belli, Hamilton Tiger-Cats
DT – Scott Schultz, Saskatchewan Roughriders
LB – Barrin Simpson, BC Lions
LB – Reggie Hunt, Saskatchewan Roughriders
LB – John Grace, Calgary Stampeders
CB – Omarr Morgan, Saskatchewan Roughriders
CB – Malcolm Frank, Edmonton Eskimos
HB – Korey Banks, Ottawa Renegades
HB – Eddie Davis, Saskatchewan Roughriders
S – Richard Karikari, Montreal Alouettes

Special teams
K – Damon Duval, Montreal Alouettes
P – Jonathan Ryan, Winnipeg Blue Bombers
ST – Corey Holmes, Saskatchewan Roughriders

Head coach
 Pinball Clemons, Toronto Argonauts

2005 Rogers CFL Awards
CFL's Most Outstanding Player Award – Damon Allen (QB), Toronto Argonauts
CFL's Most Outstanding Canadian Award – Brent Johnson (DE), BC Lions
CFL's Most Outstanding Defensive Player Award – John Grace (LB), Calgary Stampeders
CFL's Most Outstanding Offensive Lineman Award – Gene Makowsky (OT), Saskatchewan Roughriders
CFL's Most Outstanding Rookie Award – Gavin Walls (DE), Winnipeg Blue Bombers
CFL's Most Outstanding Special Teams Award – Corey Holmes (RB), Saskatchewan Roughriders
CFLPA's Outstanding Community Service Award – Danny McManus (QB), Hamilton Tiger-Cats
Rogers Fans' Choice Award – Damon Allen (QB), Toronto Argonauts
CFL's Scotiabank Coach of the Year – Tom Higgins, Calgary Stampeders
Commissioner's Award – The Water Boys, Vancouver

References

2005 in Canadian football
2005